The Humboldt Forum is a museum dedicated to human history, art and culture, located in the Berlin Palace on the Museum Island in the historic centre of Berlin. It is in honour of the Prussian scholars Wilhelm and Alexander von Humboldt. Considered the "German equivalent" of the British Museum, the Humboldt Forum houses the non-European collections of the Berlin State Museums, temporary exhibitions and public events. Due to the COVID-19 pandemic, it opened digitally on 16 December 2020 and became accessible to the general public on 20 July 2021.

History
The Humboldt Forum incorporates two former museums, the Ethnological Museum of Berlin and the Museum of Asian Art. Both had their roots in the Ancient Prussian Art Chamber. The Ancient Prussian Art Chamber was originally established by Joachim II Hector, Elector of Brandenburg in the mid 16th century, but was nearly destroyed during the Thirty Years' War (1618–1648). The art chamber was rebuilt as a magnificent collection by Frederick William, Elector of Brandenburg, and was moved to the newly extended Berlin Palace by Frederick I of Prussia in the early 18th century. The Ethnological Museum opened in 1886 as a successor of the Ancient Prussian Art Chamber; the Museum of Asian Art originated as the Indian Department of the Ethnological Museum in 1904. Wilhelm von Bode, the Director-General of the Royal Museums in Berlin, established the Museum of East Asian Art as a separate collection in 1906. In 2006 the Museum of Indian Art and the Museum of East Asian Art were merged to form the Museum of Asian Art.

From 2020 the Ethnological Museum and the Museum of Asian Art are both part of the Humboldt Forum in the Berlin Palace. By 2019, the Forum's overall costs totaled $700 million; at the time, it was considered Europe's most expensive cultural project. Its opening was initially planned for autumn 2019, then delayed to 2020 due to technical problems, including with its air conditioning system. Delivery delays and the unavailability of workers during a lockdown due to the COVID-19 pandemic in Germany pushed it back a few months further. In April 2020, two tar cookers exploded at the construction site, injuring one worker.

Building

The Humboldt Forum has its seat in the reconstructed Berlin Palace. The foundation stone was laid by President Joachim Gauck in a ceremony on 12 June 2013.

Museum
On completion in 2020, the City Palace housed the Ethnological Museum of Berlin and the Museum of Asian Art, as well as two restaurants, a theater, a movie theater and an auditorium. The project is led by a three-member management committee, chaired by founding director Neil MacGregor and also including the co-directors, archaeologist Hermann Parzinger and art historian Horst Bredekamp. The Foundation for the Humboldt Forum in the Berlin Palace has been set up to create the museum.

MacGregor has proposed to make the museum admission-free, based on the model of the British Museum.

Controversy
Like many of its counterparts in other western countries, such as the British Museum, the museum has become embroiled in controversy over its ownership of looted art and other artifacts which were obtained from the German colonial empire in Africa and Asia. In 2018, it was at the center of a debate about the legality of cultural heritage from former colonies in Germany, drawing protests from art historians such as Bénédicte Savoy and activists, who alleged the museum had not done enough to research the provenance and fails to critically present ethnographic objects in its collection.

Gallery
Images of the highlights shown at the Humboldt Forum.

See also 
 Museum Island

References

External links

Buildings and structures under construction in Berlin
Rebuilt buildings and structures in Berlin
Art museums and galleries in Berlin
Museums in Berlin
Museum Island